threo-4-Methylmethylphenidate (4-MeTMP) is a stimulant drug related to methylphenidate. It is slightly less potent than methylphenidate and has relatively low efficacy at blocking dopamine reuptake despite its high binding affinity, which led to its investigation as a possible substitute drug for treatment of stimulant abuse (cf. nocaine). On the other hand, several other simple ring-substituted derivatives of threo-methylphenidate such as the 4-fluoro and 3-chloro compounds are more potent than methylphenidate both in efficacy as dopamine reuptake inhibitors and in animal drug discrimination assays.

Legality
4-Methylmethylphenidate was banned in the UK as a Temporary Class Drug from June 2015 following its unapproved sale as a designer drug.

See also 
 3-Bromomethylphenidate
 3,4-Dichloromethylphenidate
 4-Fluoromethylphenidate
 4-Methylphenmetrazine
 Dexmethylphenidate
 HDMP-28
 Isopropylphenidate
 Propylphenidate

References 

Stimulants
Designer drugs
2-Benzylpiperidines
Methyl esters
Carboxylate esters
2-Piperidinyl compounds